Yu Wenjun (297– March or April 328, formally Empress Mingmu (明穆皇后, literally "the understanding and solemn empress") was an empress of the Chinese Jin dynasty by marriage to Emperor Ming. She served as regent during the minority of her son Emperor Cheng from 2 November 325 to early March 328, when the capital Jiankang fell to Su Jun and Emperor Cheng became Su's captive.

Life
Empress Yu's father Yu Chen (庾琛) was the governor of Kuaiji Commandery along the southern shore of Hangzhou Bay and later served on the staff of Sima Rui the Prince of Langye (later Emperor Yuan) when Sima Rui was posted at Jianye.  She was considered kind and beautiful, and Sima Rui took her to be his son Sima Shao's wife.  Her elder brother Yu Liang became a key friend and advisor to Sima Shao. Later, after Sima Rui declared himself emperor and created Sima Shao crown prince, she became crown princess.  After Emperor Yuan died in 323 and Sima Shao succeeded to the throne as Emperor Ming, she became empress. She had two sons with him, Sima Yan and Sima Yue, the future emperors Cheng and Kang respectively.

Regency
Emperor Ming only ruled briefly and died in 18 October 325. Initially, he left a balance of power between high-level officials with whom he entrusted the four-year-old Crown Prince Yan, who later succeeded to the throne as Emperor Cheng on 19 October 325. Empress Yu was honored as Empress Dowager Yu on the same day, and the officials encouraged her to become regent. Under this arrangement, Yu Liang became the most powerful official of the empire.  He became apprehensive of the generals Su Jun, Zu Yue, and Tao Kan, each of whom suspected Yu of erasing their names from Sima Shao's will, which promoted and honored a large number of officials. Yu Liang was also apprehensive of Emperor Ming's step-uncle Yu Yin (虞胤) and the Imperial Princes Sima Zong (司馬宗) the Prince of Nandun and Sima Yang (司馬羕) the Prince of Xiyang, all of whom were powerful during Emperor Ming's reign but who had been removed under Empress Dowager Yu's regency. In winter 326, Yu Liang accused Sima Zong of treason and killed him, demoted Sima Yang, and exiled Yu Yin. This led to the people losing confidence in him.

Deposition, death and burial
In 327, Yu Liang further resolved on separating Su, then the governor of Liyang Commandery (歷陽, roughly modern Chaohu, Anhui) from his troops, and he promoted Su to minister of agriculture—a post that did not involve commanding troops. Su saw his intent and declared a rebellion, with Zu's assistance. Yu Liang initially thought that Su could be easily defeated, but instead Su quickly arrived at the capital in early March 328 and captured it. Yu Liang was forced to flee. Meanwhile, Su granted himself and Zu various titles on 5 March 328 and allowed his troops to pillage the capital; it was said that even Empress Dowager Yu's servant girls became spoils for his troops. Further, it was said that Su himself "humiliated" Empress Dowager Yu— although the method of humiliation was not specified in history, it is believed that she was raped by the troops. Empress Dowager Yu died in distress and fear at the age of 32 (by East Asian reckoning). Her son Emperor Cheng became Su's captive for months before other provincial generals converged on Jiankang and defeated Su. The empress dowager's body was eventually recovered and she was buried on 19 May 328.

References

 Book of Jin, vol. 07, vol. 32, vol. 73.
 Zizhi Tongjian, vols. 90, 92, 93, 94.

297 births
328 deaths
Jin dynasty (266–420) empresses
4th-century women rulers
4th-century Chinese women
4th-century Chinese people